Heike John (now Heike Walpot; born 19 June 1960) is a German retired swimmer and former astronaut candidate.

She won a bronze medal at the 1977 European Aquatics Championships. She competed at the 1976 Summer Olympics in the 100 m and 200 m backstroke events but did not reach the finals. During her career she won five national titles in the 100 m (1977) and 200 m (1977, 1978) backstroke and 200 m medley (1977, 1978). She missed the 1980 Summer Olympics because of their boycott by West Germany.

After her swimming career, she studied medicine at RWTH Aachen and earned a doctorate in 1987. In the same year she was selected as one of five West German astronaut candidates for the Spacelab D-2 mission, along with Hans Schlegel, Ulrich Walter, Gerhard Thiele and Renate Brümmer. She served as Cap com during the D-2 mission in 1993, but was never assigned to a spaceflight herself. After retiring as an astronaut, she became a professional pilot for Lufthansa. She is married to astronaut Hans Schlegel.

References

External links 
 Walpot, Heike at astronautix.com
 Heike Walpot at spacefacts.de (in German)
 Heike Walpot (John) at astronaut.ru (in Russian)

1960 births
Living people
German female swimmers
Swimmers at the 1976 Summer Olympics
Female backstroke swimmers
Olympic swimmers of West Germany
European Aquatics Championships medalists in swimming
German astronauts
Lufthansa people
Sportspeople from Düsseldorf